State Route 197 (SR 197) is a state highway in the U.S. state of California located north of Crescent City in Del Norte County.  Running along the north bank of the Smith River as North Bank Road, SR 197 is a bypass connecting U.S. Highways 199 and 101.

Route description
SR 197 begins with an intersection at U.S. Route 199 in Jedediah Smith Redwoods State Park. Moving northward, the road quickly exits the park, roughly paralleling the Smith River located to the west side of the road. The road then follows the river northward and then northwestward with several local roads meeting SR 197 along the evergreen forest area. The road meets its northern terminus at U.S. Route 101 just south of the Oregon border.

SR 197 is not part of the National Highway System, a network of highways that are considered essential to the country's economy, defense, and mobility by the Federal Highway Administration.

Major intersections

See also

References

External links

California @ AARoads.com - State Route 197
Caltrans: Route 197 highway conditions
California Highways: SR 197

197
State Route 197